Vítor Simões da Vinha (born 11 November 1986) is a Portuguese former footballer who played as a left back.

Playing career

Club
Vinha was born in Oliveira de Frades, Viseu District. He reached Académica de Coimbra's youth system at the age of 13, going on to represent that side, Estrela da Amadora, Olhanense and Gil Vicente in the Primeira Liga, and appeared for Aves, Beira-Mar and Famalicão in the Segunda Liga.

In the 2009–10 season, Vinha competed in the Cypriot First Division with Nea Salamis Famagusta. In June 2010, he considered the possibility of taking the club to court due to unpaid wages.

International
Vinha won 14 caps for Portugal, all youth categories comprised. His only appearance for the under-21 team occurred on 19 August 2008, as he played the full 90 minutes in a 2–3 friendly home loss against the Czech Republic.

Coaching career
On 7 October 2018, Vinha served as interim manager at former club Académica after Carlos Pinto had been fired the day before a second-tier match against Estoril. Three days later, João Alves, their seventh coach in less than 18 months, was hired.

In December 2020, Vinha joined Luís Freire's staff at C.D. Nacional after having started the season at Académica's under-19s.

References

External links

1986 births
Living people
Portuguese footballers
Association football defenders
Primeira Liga players
Liga Portugal 2 players
Segunda Divisão players
Associação Académica de Coimbra – O.A.F. players
G.D. Tourizense players
C.F. Estrela da Amadora players
C.D. Aves players
S.C. Olhanense players
Gil Vicente F.C. players
S.C. Beira-Mar players
F.C. Famalicão players
Cypriot First Division players
Nea Salamis Famagusta FC players
Portugal youth international footballers
Portugal under-21 international footballers
Portuguese expatriate footballers
Expatriate footballers in Cyprus
Portuguese expatriate sportspeople in Cyprus
Portuguese football managers
Liga Portugal 2 managers
Associação Académica de Coimbra – O.A.F. managers
Sportspeople from Viseu District